Darwin Glacier is a large glacier in Antarctica. It flows from the polar plateau eastward between the Darwin Mountains and the Cook Mountains to the Ross Ice Shelf. The lower part of the glacier was mapped by the British National Antarctic Expedition, 1901–04, and the whole area traversed by New Zealand parties of the Commonwealth Trans-Antarctic Expedition (1956–58). The glacier was named in association with the Darwin Mountains (themselves named after Leonard Darwin).

Robertson Buttress is the westernmost in a series of large rock buttresses on the south side of Darwin Glacier between Alley Glacier and Gaussiran Glacier.

See also
 Erewhon Basin
 List of glaciers in the Antarctic
 Glaciology
 The Nozzle
 Walker Cirque

References
 

Glaciers of Oates Land
Glaciers of Hillary Coast